Lord George Manners-Sutton (8 March 1723 – 7 January 1783, Kelham Hall), born Lord George Manners, was a British nobleman and politician, the third son of John Manners, 3rd Duke of Rutland.

On 5 December 1749, he married Diana Chaplin (d. 1767),  only daughter of Thomas Chaplin of Blankney, Lincolnshire, by whom he had nine children:
George Manners-Sutton (1751–1804)
Captain John Manners-Sutton (1752–1826), married Anne Manners, natural daughter of John Manners, Marquess of Granby, his first cousin
Captain Robert Manners-Sutton, RN (1754–1794), killed in the explosion of HMS Ardent
Charles Manners-Sutton (1755–1828), Archbishop of Canterbury
Thomas Manners-Sutton, 1st Baron Manners (1756–1842)
Captain Francis Manners-Sutton(d. 1781)
Diana Manners-Sutton, married on 21 April 1778 Francis Dickins
Louisa Bridget Manners-Sutton (d. 5 February 1800), married on 15 June 1790 Edward Lockwood-Perceval
Charlotte Manners-Sutton (d. 1827), married on 16 June 1789 Thomas Lockwood

He entered Parliament in 1754, succeeding his elder brother, the Marquess of Granby as Member of Parliament for Grantham. In 1762, he adopted the additional surname of Sutton, upon inheriting the estates of that family, including the family seat of Kelham Hall, from his elder brother Lord Robert Manners-Sutton. The change of name, though, was enabled by a 1734 Act of Parliament—many years earlier—when his brother succeeded to those estates.

On 5 February 1768, he married Mary Peart, by whom he had one daughter:
Mary Manners-Sutton (d. 20 November 1829), married in 1799 Rev. Richard Lockwood

He died at Kelham Hall in 1783 and was succeeded by his eldest son, George.

References

Manners genealogy

1723 births
1783 deaths
Younger sons of dukes
G
British MPs 1754–1761
British MPs 1761–1768
British MPs 1768–1774
British MPs 1774–1780
British MPs 1780–1784
Members of the Parliament of Great Britain for English constituencies